SS Manasoo (originally named Macassa) was a steel-hulled Canadian passenger and package freighter in service between 1888 and 1928. She was built in 1888 in Port Glasgow, Scotland, by William Hamilton & Company for the Hamilton Steamboat Company of Hamilton, Ontario. During this time, she mainly carried passengers between Hamilton and Toronto, Ontario. Macassa was lengthened in Collingwood, Ontario, in 1905. She was sold twice before being sold to the Owen Sound Transportation Company, Ltd., and was rebuilt and renamed Manasoo; after the sale, she mainly operated between Sault Ste. Marie and Owen Sound, Ontario.

After a lucrative shipping season in 1928, Manasoo was open to take on special commissions. On September 14, she left the Manitoulin Island port of Manitowaning, Ontario, under the command of Captain John McKay. There were nineteen crewmen, two passengers, 115 cows and one bull on board. By the time Manasoo had cleared the North Channel of Lake Huron, a sizeable storm had developed. By 2:00a.m. the next day, Manasoo had begun to list to port. Despite efforts to correct it, the list worsened. As she was off Griffith Island, Manasoo rolled over and sank. Five crewmen and one passenger climbed onto a life raft; one of the crew later died of exposure, while the rest were rescued by the steamer Manitoba. Sixteen people died in the wreck.

The location of Manasoos wreck was unknown for nearly 90 years, until it was found on June 30, 2018, by Jerry Eliason and Ken Merryman of Minnesota, and Cris Kohl of Windsor, Ontario.

History

Design and construction
Beginning in the mid-1840s, Canadian companies began importing iron vessels, prefabricated by shipyards in the United Kingdom. It would not be until 1889, however, that the first steel-hulled Canadian ship, Manitoba, was built on the Great Lakes. In 1887, the Hamilton Steamboat Company, a fleet managed by Tunis Bruce Griffith of Hamilton, Ontario, placed an order for a steel steamship with William Hamilton & Company, a shipyard located on the banks of the River Clyde in Port Glasgow, Scotland.

Hull number 64, built at William Hamilton & Company's Glen Yard, was christened Macassa. She was licensed to carry 536 passengers, and was equipped with an elegant interior consisting of carved, polished hardwood panels, velvet sofas, silk curtains and velvet carpets. She was also equipped with electric lights. Her main deck was completely enclosed, while her promenade deck was almost completely open, save for a small cabin. She had a single tall mast located forward of her pilothouse.

Macassa was clinker built. Macassa had a gross tonnage of 574 tons, and a net tonnage of 459 tons.

The engine was built by William Kemp of Glasgow, Scotland, while the boiler was manufactured by Burnett & Company of Govan.

Service history

Macassa was accepted by the Hamilton Steamboat Company after she completed her sea trials on the River Clyde. She was registered in Glasgow, Scotland, on May 2, 1888, and left for Hamilton on May 16. Macassas trip across the Atlantic Ocean took 15 days, as ice slowed her progress.

After Macassa arrived in Hamilton on the morning of June 7, she was given the Canadian official number 93932 on June 29, 1888, when she was registered in Hamilton. For most of her career, she was engaged in the passenger trade between Hamilton and Toronto, Ontario. Early in her career, she also stopped at Lorne Park, Oakville and Burlington Beach, Ontario.

While in Hamilton on August 11, 1892, a deckhand on board Macassa leaned against a gangway whilst trying to fill a bucket of water, fell overboard and drowned. She made a 39-mile (62.8 km) trip between Burlington and Port Dalhousie, Ontario, on April 6, 1894, in an hour and fifty minutes.

In an effort to make Macassa more profitable, she was sent to the Collingwood Shipbuilding Company of Collingwood, Ontario, in 1905 to be lengthened. The new piece was inserted between her pilothouse and funnel. Officers' quarters were constructed behind the pilothouse, the cabin on the promenade deck was enlarged, her mast was moved behind the pilothouse, and a second mast was installed aft. The lengthening significantly decreased Macassas length-to-beam ratio, causing her to roll badly even in moderate weather. On September 19, 1906, a deckhand on board Macassa lost his foot after it became entangled in a mooring line while she was in Hamilton.

In 1911, the Hamilton Steamboat Company merged into the Niagara Navigation Company, a company that operated passenger ships between Toronto and various Niagara River ports. In 1912, the Niagara Navigation Company was absorbed into the Richelieu & Ontario Navigation Company, which itself was merged into the Canada Transportation Company of Montreal, Quebec, on June 11, 1913. The Canada Transportation Company was renamed Canada Steamship Lines later in 1913.

Late in the summer of 1912, Macassa ran a special service from Coburg, Port Hope, Bowmanville, and Oshawa, Ontario, to Toronto, where she ferried passengers to and from the Canadian National Exhibition. While with Canada Steamship Lines, Macassa frequently travelled between Grimsby, Ontario, Hamilton and Toronto. She was used as the official boat for the Wrigley Marathon Swim. At the end of the 1927 shipping season, Macassa was laid up in Toronto.

In the winter of 1927, Macassa was sold to the Owen Sound Transportation Company of Owen Sound, Ontario, and was rebuilt in Toronto. Macassa was renamed Manasoo, a combination of Manitoulin Island and Sault Ste. Marie, Ontario. Her promenade deck was covered with passenger cabins, and her pilothouse and masts were replaced. After her rebuild, she was licensed to carry only 70 passengers.

Manasoo left Toronto for Owen Sound on April 22, 1928. Along the way, she stopped in Goderich, Lion's Head and Wiarton, Ontario, before arriving in Owen Sound on April 27, after which she travelled to Collingwood, where she was drydocked for an inspection. After entering service in May, she mainly operated between Sault Ste. Marie and Owen Sound, via the North Channel. Manasoo carried passengers and various different types of freight.

Final voyage
After the lucrative 1928 shipping season, Manasoo was open to special commissions. Cowman Donald Wallace of Oil Springs, Ontario, and his friend George Maurice Lambert (also of Oil Springs) drove to Owen Sound, where they boarded Manasoo. Wallace had planned to purchase cattle from several farmers from around Manitoulin Island. Under the command of Captain John Ross McKay, Manasoo began her voyage on September 11. She sailed to Little Current, Ontario, then to West Bay, Ontario where she loaded 18 more cows to add to the herd of cows purchased from around Manitoulin Island, and then she proceeded to Manitowaning, Ontario. She left Manitowaning for Owen Sound at 12:00p.m. on September 14, with 19 crewmen, two passengers, 115 cows and one bull on board. By the time Manasoo had cleared the North Channel of Lake Huron, a sizeable storm with  winds had developed. By 2:00a.m. the next day, Manasoo had begun to list to port. Captain McKay eventually decided to beach Manasoo on nearby Griffith Island. Eventually, Manasoos starboard bilge lifted out of the water, causing water to leak in through gangways and other openings. First mate Oswald "Oz" Long ordered the lifeboats launched, although only one lifeboat was launched before Manasoo rolled over onto her port side, and sank stern first.

Manasoo sank in three to five minutes. The only lifeboat launched capsized. A life raft broke loose when Manasoo sank; Captain McKay, first mate Long, chief engineer Thomas McCutcheon, purser Arthur Middleboro, oiler Roy Fox and Wallace were able to climb aboard. McCutcheon died of exposure, and his clothes were distributed among the survivors. After floating on the raft for 60 hours, the survivors were rescued by the Canadian Pacific Railway steamer Manitoba. 16 of the 21 people on board died. Although the specific reason for Manasoo sinking remains unknown, the shifting of the cattle is believed to be partly responsible.

Manasoo wreck

Discovery
Her wreck was discovered on June 30, 2018, after a four-day search using side-scan sonar, by shipwreck hunters Jerry Eliason and Ken Merryman of Minnesota, and maritime historian Cris Kohl of Windsor, Ontario. Eliason and Merryman had unsuccessfully tried to locate her in 2017. He had found a newspaper account published in 1928, which stated that Manasoos wreck had been located a few weeks after she sank.

Manasoo today
The wreck is intact, although encrusted with zebra mussels, with its stern buried in the lake bottom and the bow pointing upwards at a 10° to 15° angle. The pilothouse and helm are intact. Manasoos collapsed funnel and two of her lifeboats are located on her deck, while another lies next to her wreck. Also within the wreck is Wallace's 1927 Chevrolet coupé, with its number plates still attached.

Notes

References

Sources

 
 
 
 
 
 
 
 
 
 
 
 
 
 
 
 
 
 
 
 
 
 
 
 
 
 
 
 

1888 ships
Maritime incidents in 1928
Shipwrecks of Lake Huron
Shipwrecks of the Ontario coast
Ships built on the River Clyde
Great Lakes ships
Merchant ships of Canada
Ships powered by a triple expansion steam engine
Package freighters
2018 archaeological discoveries
Ships sunk in storms